Ryu Han-bi (born February 13, 2004) is a South Korean actress.

Filmography

Film

Television series

Award and nominations

References

External links

2004 births
Living people
South Korean child actresses
South Korean television actresses
South Korean film actresses